Nemotelus flavocingulatus is a species of soldier fly in the family Stratiomyidae.

Distribution
Argentina.

References

Stratiomyidae
Insects described in 1914
Diptera of South America
Endemic fauna of Argentina
Taxa named by Kálmán Kertész